The Ericrocidini are a tribe of apid bees.

Genera
Acanthopus
Aglaomelissa
Ctenioschelus
Epiclopus
Ericrocis
Hopliphora
Mesocheira
Mesonychium
Mesoplia

References

C. D. Michener (2000) The Bees of the World, Johns Hopkins University Press.

{{}}

Apinae
Bee tribes